Lawali Hassan Anka is a Nigerian politician, a senator and a member of the 9th National Assembly representing Anka/Mafara constituency. As of August 2020, Anka had not sponsored any legislation.

References

Living people
Year of birth missing (living people)
Place of birth missing (living people)
Members of the Senate (Nigeria)